A la valenciana (translated in English as "The Valencian Way"), officially named as Compromís–Podemos–EUPV: A la valenciana, was an electoral coalition formed by Coalició Compromís, Podemos and United Left of the Valencian Country in May 2016 to contest the 2016 Spanish general election in the autonomous community of Valencia. The alliance was the successor of the És el moment coalition that contested the 2015 general election.

The alliance name refers to the proposed coalition government offered by Podemos and Compromís to the PSOE in the Congress of Deputies. Such an offer was based on the agreement reached in the Valencian Community between the Socialist Party of the Valencian Country and Compromís, that made their leaders Ximo Puig and Mònica Oltra the regional premier and vice premier, respectively.

Composition

Electoral performance

Cortes Generales

See also
En Comú Podem
En Marea

Notes

References

Political parties established in 2016
Political parties in the Valencian Community
Defunct political party alliances in Spain
2016 establishments in the Valencian Community
Podemos (Spanish political party)
Unidas Podemos